Third-seeded Vic Seixas defeated Rex Hartwig 3–6, 6–2, 6–4, 6–4 in the final to win the men's singles tennis title at the 1954 U.S. National Championships.

Seeds
The tournament used two lists of ten players for seeding the men's singles event; one for U.S. players and one for foreign players. Vic Seixas is the champion; others show the round in which they were eliminated.

U.S.
  Tony Trabert (quarterfinals)
  Vic Seixas (champion)
  Ham Richardson (semifinals)
  Arthur Larsen (quarterfinals)
  Eddie Moylan (fourth round)
  Straight Clark (third round)
  Gardnar Mulloy (fourth round)
  Tom Brown (quarterfinals)
  Tut Bartzen (third round)
  Bill Talbert (fourth round)

Foreign
  Lew Hoad (quarterfinals)
  Ken Rosewall (semifinals)
  Sven Davidson (fourth round)
  Rex Hartwig (finalist)
  Lennart Bergelin (third round)
  Neale Fraser (fourth round)
  Owen Williams (fourth round)
  Kosei Kamo (third round)
  Lorne Main (third round)
  Roger Becker (third round)

Draw

Key
 Q = Qualifier
 WC = Wild card
 LL = Lucky loser
 r = Retired

Final eight

Earlier rounds

Section 1

Section 2

Section 3

Section 4

Section 5

Section 6

Section 7

Section 8

References

External links
 1954 U.S. National Championships on ITFtennis.com, the source for this draw (incomplete link)
 1954 U.S. National Championships, ATP

Men's Singles
U.S. National Championships (tennis) by year – Men's singles